Olszewski (feminine Olszewska, plural Olszewscy, alternative Olszowski) is a Polish surname. The Russian-language version is Olshevsky, feminine: Olshevskaya. The Lithuanian language forms are Olšauskas  and Alšauskas, feminine: Olšauskienė/Alšauskienė (married), and Olšauskaitė/Alšauskaitė (unmarried). Belarusian form: Альшэўскі (Alsheuski or Alshewski).

Origin could be derived from Polish word olsza or olcha, which means alder tree.

Notable people with the surname include:

 Agata Mróz-Olszewska (1982-2008), Polish volleyball player
 Albert Olszewski (born 1962), American politician
 Alfons Olszewski (1916-2006), Polish sailor
 Bobby Olszewski (born 1977), American politician
 Dariusz Olszewski (born 1967), Polish politician
 Eileen Olszewski (born 1968), American boxer
 Gunner Olszewski (born 1996), American football player
 Jan Olszewski (1930-2019), Polish lawyer and political figure
 John A. Olszewski, Jr. (born 1982), American politician
 Johnny Olszewski (1929-1996), American football running back
 Karol Olszewski (1846-1915), Polish chemist, mathematician and physicist
 Krzysztof Olszewski (born 1970), Polish photographer, visual and installation artist
 Maria Olszewska (1892-1969), German opera singer
 Maria Olszewska-Lelonkiewicz (1939-2007), Polish figure skating coach
 Michał Olszewski (chess player) (born 1989), Polish chess grandmaster
 Michał Olszewski (priest) (1712-1779), Lithuanian Catholic priest and author
 Milena Olszewska (born 1984), Polish Paralympic archer
 Paweł Olszewski (politician) (born 1979), Polish economist and politician
 Paweł Olszewski (footballer), Polish footballer
 Piotr Olszewski (born 1973), Polish rower
 Remigiusz Olszewski (born 1992), Polish sprinter
 Sławomir Olszewski (born 1973), Polish goalkeeper
 Stanisław Olszewski (1852-1898), Polish engineer and inventor
 Włodzimierz Olszewski (born 1956), Polish ice hockey player

See also
 Olszewski tube
 Progressive supranuclear palsy, aka Steele-Richardson-Olszewski syndrome
 Olszeski Town, Ohio

References

Polish-language surnames